James Morgan McKelvey Jr. is an American billionaire businessman, who is the co-founder of Block, Inc. McKelvey was appointed as an independent director of the Federal Reserve Bank of St. Louis in January 2017. As of November 2021, his net worth was estimated at US$4 billion.

Early life
James Morgan McKelvey Jr. was born and raised in St. Louis, Missouri, and is an alumnus of Ladue Horton Watkins High School. He wrote and published a Handbook on UCSD Pascal and Apple Pascal in 1986. After graduation from Washington University in St. Louis, McKelvey worked as a contractor for IBM in Los Angeles and in St. Louis. At the same time, he had jobs as a glassblowing instructor and founded Disconcepts, a CD cabinet manufacturing company.

Career

Third Degree Glass Factory 
In 2000, after giving a glassblowing demonstration at WUSTL, McKelvey met Doug Auer. In 2002 they founded Third Degree Glass Factory in St. Louis, a glass art studio and gallery which also provides space for private events. He talks about this extensively in the Shaping Business Minds Through Art podcast.

Block, Inc. (formerly known as Square, Inc.) 

In 2009, McKelvey co-founded Square with Jack Dorsey. Professor Robert Morley designed the hardware used by Square in 2009, while McKelvey and Jack Dorsey later created a separate entity leaving Morley out of this entity's ownership. McKelvey then served as Square's chairman until 2010. , McKelvey sits on the Board of Directors at Block, Inc.

Cultivation Capital 
In 2012, McKelvey teamed with other St. Louis-based businesspeople to help found Cultivation Capital, a venture capital firm that manages early-stage venture capital funds in software, life sciences, and agtech.

Invisibly 
In June 2016, McKelvey founded Invisibly, a company seeking to allow consumers to profit from their online data.

The Federal Reserve 
In 2017, McKelvey was appointed as an Independent Director of the Federal Reserve Bank of St. Louis.

NoW Innovation District 

Since 2019, McKelvey and business partner John Berglund, as StarLake Holdings have been building the NoW Innovation District in downtown St. Louis.

Non-profit work

LaunchCode 
In September 2013, McKelvey co-founded LaunchCode, a non-profit organization that aims to grow new talent and create pathways to on-the-job training and employment. LaunchCode partners with companies to set up paid apprenticeships in technology for talented people who lack the traditional credentials to land a quality, high-paying job. In 2014, LaunchCode was named "The Best Thing to Happen to St. Louis" by the St. Louis Riverfront Times. In February 2019, LaunchCode received a $300,000 grant from the Ewing Marion Kauffman Foundation to support education programming.

Philanthropy 
In 2016, McKelvey donated $15 million to the Washington University School of Engineering and Applied Science to build a new computer science and engineering building named after his father. In 2019, Washington University's engineering school was renamed the McKelvey School of Engineering.

Works

References

External links 
 
 
 

Living people
Businesspeople from St. Louis
Block, Inc. employees
American computer businesspeople
American computer scientists
Ladue Horton Watkins High School alumni
Washington University in St. Louis alumni
American glass artists
20th-century American sculptors
21st-century American sculptors
21st-century male artists
American male sculptors
American installation artists
Glassblowers
Artists from St. Louis
American billionaires
Year of birth missing (living people)